Pseudonocardia mongoliensis is a bacterium from the genus of Pseudonocardia which has been isolated from soil near the Khuvsgul Lake in Khuvsgul in the Mongolia.

References

Pseudonocardia
Bacteria described in 2011